Theatre Albany is an amateur production company in downtown Albany, Georgia, U.S.  It presents six major productions annually.

The theater seats 314 and is located at 514 Pine Avenue in the Capt. John A. Davis House which is listed on the National Register of Historic Places.

External links
Official website of Theatre Albany

Theatres in Georgia (U.S. state)
Buildings and structures in Albany, Georgia
Tourist attractions in Albany, Georgia